Rev. Kinley McMillan was an Presbyterian clergymen and an American football coach. He was an 1886 graduate of the College of Wooster and am 1889 graduate of Princeton Seminary.

After graduating from seminary, McMillan returned to his alma mater to serve as a minister. During that time, he also organized the school's first varsity football team. He served the head coach of the 1889 and 1890 squads, accumulating a record of 7 wins and no losses. During the 1889 season opener against Denison University, Wooster scored the first points in Ohio college football history.

McMillan also served as a pastor in McKeesport, Pennsylvania and Baltimore, Maryland.

In 1967, McMillan was honored as a charter member of the College of Wooster Hall of Fame. He was noted for his oratory abilities and his strong devotion to preaching the Gospel.

References

Year of birth missing
Year of death missing
College of Wooster alumni
Princeton Theological Seminary alumni
Wooster Fighting Scots baseball players
Wooster Fighting Scots football coaches